Kushlu may refer to:
 Kushlu, Ardabil
 Kushlu, Zanjan